Loutro is a village and a community of the Elassona municipality. Before the 2011 local government reform, Loutro was part of the municipality of Antichasia, of which it was a municipal district and the seat. The 2011 census recorded 702 inhabitants in the village. The community of Loutro covers an area of 29.165 km2.

History
The village is over 500 years old. It is recorded as village and as "Lutro" in the Ottoman Tahrir Defter number 101 dating to 1521.

Population
According to the 2011 census, the population of the settlement of Loutro was 702 people, an increase of almost 5% compared with the population of the previous census of 2001.

See also
 List of settlements in the Larissa regional unit

References

Populated places in Larissa (regional unit)